The Zug Stadtbahn is an S-Bahn-style commuter rail network centred on Zug, Switzerland.

Opened on 12 December 2004, the network forms part of the Central Switzerland S-Bahn project, which also includes the Lucerne S-Bahn.

Lines
, the network consisted of the following lines:

  Baar–Zug–Cham–Rotkreuz–(Luzern)  (also  of the Lucerne S-Bahn)
  Baar Lindenpark–Zug–Walchwil–Arth-Goldau–(Erstfeld)

S2 service was suspended altogether on 9 April 2020.

Rolling stock
The trains acquired by the SBB-CFF-FFS to operate the S1 services on the Zug Stadtbahn are SBB-CFF-FFS RABe 523 class electric multiple units.

Additionally, Basel Regional S-Bahn trains were used to operate some services in 2008.

Since December 2008, all Zug Stadtbahn services have been operated by a fleet of twelve RABe 523s.

See also

Transport in Zug

References

External links

 SBB-CFF-FFS – official site

S-Bahn in Switzerland
Stadtbahn